On August 11, 2016, two bombs exploded in the Thai resort town of Hua Hin.  One person was killed and 23, many of them tourists, were injured. The next day, several more bombings took place, again targeting Hua Hin as well as Surat Thani, Phuket and Trang. At least two people were killed and many more were injured. In total, at least four people were killed and 36 injured.

August 11th
Two bombs exploded in Hua Hin at about 10:20 p.m. local time on 11 August. One Thai woman selling fruit on the street was killed and 23 people, including twelve foreigners, were injured. The injured include two English, two Dutch, one German and seven from Austria and Italy.

August 12th

Hua Hin 
Three more explosions occurred in Hua Hin on 12 August, killing one and injuring at least four others.

Surat Thani 
A bomb that had been hidden in a flower pot exploded outside the Surat Thani police station and killed a municipal employee.

Phuket 
Phuket Island was hit with two explosions on 12 August. The first occurred in the Loma Park, an area popular with tourists. The second occurred in Patong near a police station.

Trang 
A bombing occurred in Trang, killing one person and injuring six others.

Casualties

Reaction 
No group has claimed responsibility but authorities strongly suspect that Pattani separatists are behind the bombings.

On 12 August, the Prime Minister Prayut Chan-o-cha mentioned "bad people [that] have been acting since before the referendum." and "[w]e must not blame one another. We have never hurt or had conflicts with anyone, be it domestic or abroad."

Two suspects have been arrested in relation to the bombings with the Thai government stating their motive was "to create chaos and confusion".

See also
 2005 Songkhla bombings
 2006 Hat Yai bombings
 2007 South Thailand bombings
 2012 Southern Thailand bombings
 22 December 2013 South Thailand bombings

References

2016 in Thailand
2016 crimes in Thailand
Attacks on tourists
August 2016 crimes in Asia
August 2016 events in Thailand
Improvised explosive device bombings in Thailand
Terrorist incidents in Thailand in 2016
Mass murder in 2016
Mass murder in Thailand